Rakowitz is a Germanized Slavic habitational surname. Notable people with the name include:
 Cindy Rakowitz, American executive
 Daniel Rakowitz (1960), American murderer and cannibal
 Michael Rakowitz (1973), Iraqi-American artist
 Stefan Rakowitz (1990), Austrian professional footballer

References 

German-language surnames
Toponymic surnames
Germanized Slavic family names